Mastenbroek is a polder in the Netherlands, and a village in that polder.

Mastenbroek may also refer to:

 Rie Mastenbroek (1919–2003), Dutch swimmer, Olympic gold medalist
 Emile Mastenbroek, Dutch politician, Queen's Commissioner of Limburg in the 1990s
 Marieke Mastenbroek, Dutch swimmer, gold medalist in the 1991 European Aquatics Championships
 Edith Mastenbroek (1975–2012), a Dutch Member of the European Parliament